Motreff is a commune in the Finistère department of Brittany in north-western France.

Geography

Historically, Motreff belongs to Cornouaille. The village lies on the northern slope of the Montagnes Noires (french, Black Mountains).

Population
Inhabitants of Motreff are called in French Motreffois.

Map

See also
Communes of the Finistère department

References

External links

Mayors of Finistère Association 

Communes of Finistère